Orienteering Association of Hong Kong (OAHK) is the HSK organisation responsible for orienteering in Hong Kong. It is a Full Member of the International Orienteering Federation.

Currently, OAHK sends Hong Kong teams to participate in World Orienteering Championships, Junior World Orienteering Championships, World Trail Orienteering Championships, Asian Orienteering Championships and All China Orienteering Championships, and organises the Hong Kong Annual Orienteering Championships in Hong Kong every year.

References

External links
Homepage

Hong Kong
Sports governing bodies in Hong Kong